Rüttenscheider Stern is an underground station on the Essen Stadtbahn line U11 in Essen. The station lies on Rüttenscheider Stern in the district of Rüttenscheid. It is equipped with three-rail tracks to allow tramway cars of the lines 101 and 107 to stop at the station as well.

The station was opened on June 1, 1986 and consists of two side-platform with two rail tracks. On the surface, it provides connection to the 106 tramway line.

External links 

 

Underground rapid transit in Germany
Railway stations in Essen